Francis Bruce "Trackhorse" Pratt (August 24, 1897 – March 8, 1974) was a pinch hitter in Major League Baseball. He played for the Chicago White Sox in 1921.

References

External links

1897 births
1974 deaths
People from Bibb County, Alabama
Chicago White Sox players
Baseball players from Alabama